Romagna is an Italian historical region that approximately corresponds to the south-eastern portion of present-day Emilia-Romagna, North Italy. Traditionally, it is limited by the Apennines to the south-west, the Adriatic to the east, and the rivers Reno and Sillaro to the north and west. The region's major cities include Cesena, Faenza, Forlì, Imola, Ravenna, Rimini and City of San Marino (San Marino is a landlocked state inside the Romagna historical region). The region has been recently formally expanded with the transfer from the Marche region of nine comuni where the Romagnol language is spoken (Casteldelci, Maiolo, Novafeltria, Pennabilli, San Leo, Sant'Agata Feltria, Talamello, Montecopiolo, Sassofeltrio).

Etymology
The name Romagna originates from the Latin name Romania, which originally was the generic name for "land inhabited by Romans", and first appeared on Latin documents in the 5th century AD. Thus the term Romania came to be used to refer to the territory administered by the Exarchate of Ravenna in contrast to other parts of Northern Italy under Lombard rule, named Langobardia or Lombardy.

History

Prehistory
A number of archaeological sites in the region, such as Monte Poggiolo, show that Romagna has been inhabited since the Paleolithic age.

Umbri and Gauls
The Umbri, speaking an extinct Italic language called Umbrian, are the first traceable inhabitants of the region. The Etruscans also dwelt in some portions of Romagna.

In the 5th Century BC, various Gaulish tribes, most notably the Lingones, Senoni and Boii, moved south into Italy, and sacked Rome in 390 BC. The Senoni utterly subjugated the Umbri and settled in Romagna. The Senoni extended further south to Ancona, with their capital Sena Gallica (Senigallia). The lands formerly inhabited by the Senoni were known as ager Gallicus (Gallic plain) to the Romans.

According to the Italian linguist Giacomo Devoto, there are still a number of Celtic substrata in the Romagnolo dialect.

Roman Republic
Gallic predominance in the region was consistently challenged by the Romans. In the battle of Telamon in 225 BC, the Romans defeated the joint forces of the Celtic tribes, thus achieving a hegemony over the new Roman Province of Cisalpine Gaul centred at Mutina (modern Modena).

After the Second Punic War, the pro-Carthaginian Lingones and Senoni were expelled. To consolidate the Roman rule in the region, the Via Aemilia was built from Ariminium (Rimini) to Piacentia (Piacenza), and a series of Roman colonies were founded. The most significant ones are Forum Livii (Forlì), Forum Cornelii (Imola) and Forum Popili (Forlimpopoli). After the Social War, the Lex Julia was introduced in 90 BC, and Roman citizenship was granted to all municipia south of the River Po.

In the first Roman civil war, between Gaius Marius and Lucius Cornelius Sulla, most cities in the regions supported Marius. As a result, Forum Livii and Caesena were razed to ground, and the region was looted by Sulla's army.

During the first triumvirate, the Roman Republic was divided along the infamous Rubicon. Most of modern Romagna was ruled by Julius Caesar, with the notable exception of Ariminium, which is south of the river. In 49 BC, Caesar, who had been residing in Ravenna, led the Legio XIII across the Rubicon and ignited Caesar's civil war.

Roman Empire
After the decisive battle of Actium, the reign of Augustus started a centuries-long era of Pax Romana. All of Cisalpine Gaul had been incorporated into the Roman province of Italia. Around 7 BC, Augustus divided all of Italy into eleven regiones, and most of Romagna (except Rimini) was in the eighth, Aemilia.

Towards the end of the 3rd Century, Diocletian re-ordered the Empire into four prefectures, each divided into dioceses, which in turn were divided into provinces. Under the new system, Italy was demoted to a mere Imperial province. Modern Romagna was organized into the Roman province of Flaminia et Picenum in the diocese of Italia Annonaria.

Ravenna, which was surrounded by swamps and marshes, prospered and steadily rose in importance, and a Roman fleet was based at the city. It had developed into a major port on the Adriatic. However, in 330, the capital of the Empire was transferred to Constantinople, so with the fleet that stationed at Ravenna, thus weakened the coastal defence in the Adriatic.

Germanic migrations and Exarchate of Ravenna
Stepping into the 5th Century, the Germanic migrations into the Empire further intensified. In 402, Emperor Honorius even moved the Western Roman Empire's capital from Mediolanum to Ravenna, mainly because of the region's defensive terrain. 8 years later, Alaric I of the Visigoths looted Rome. In 476, Odoacer deposed Romulus in Ravenna, thus marking an end to the Western Empire.

Encouraged by Emperor Zeno, Theodoric the Great led the Ostrogoths into Italy. He entered Ravenna and murdered Odoacer in 493, establishing a twofold kingdom of the Romans and Goths. Under the Ostrogoths Italy was partly restored to its former prosperity.

In 535 Justinian I initiated the Gothic War. It was fought for 20 years, and the Ostrogoths were finally subjugated. The peninsula, depopulated and devastated, was ruled by an exarch from Ravenna. However, Imperial authority was maintained for barely more than a decade. In 568 new Germanic tribes, the Lombards, entered Italy, and established their capital at Pavia. The Empire could barely defend the region around Ravenna and Rome, connected by a narrow strip of land passing through Perugia, as well as a series of coastal cities. The Imperial frontier retreated to Bologna.

In 727 the Lombard King Liutprand renewed war against the Byzantines, taking most of Romagna and besieging Ravenna itself. These territories were returned to the Byzantines in 730. In 737 the king entered Romagna once more and took Ravenna. The exarch, Eutychius, retook the region in 740, with Venetian assistance. Eventually another Lombard king, Aistulf, conquered Romagna once more, and brought an end to the exarchate in 751.

Papal rule

King Rudolf I of Germany officially ceded Romagna to the Papal States in 1278. However, Papal control over the area long remained only nominal. The region was divided among a series of regional lords, such as the Ordelaffi of Forlì or the Malatesta of Rimini, many of them adhering to the Ghibelline party in opposition to the pro-papal Guelphs. This situation started to change in the late-15th century, when after their return to Rome from Avignon in 1378, stronger popes progressively reasserted their authority in the fragmented region. Parts of Romagna were also seized by other powers, including Venice, and most notably the Republic of Florence, which took land up to Forlì and Cervia, building the famous city-fortress of Terra del Sole. The Florentine Romagna remained part of Tuscany until the 1920s.

In 1500 Cesare Borgia, illegitimate son of Pope Alexander VI, carved out for himself an ephemeral Duchy of Romagna, but his lands were reabsorbed into the Papal States after his fall. In 1559 the Peace of Cateau-Cambrésis divided Romagna between the Farnese family of the Duchy of Parma and Piacenza, the House of Este of the Ferrara, and the Duchy of Modena and Reggio, and the Papal States. The Duchy of Ferrara was later annexed by the Papal States on the extinction of the main d'Este line in 1597, with the cadet branch retaining the Imperial fiefs of Modena and Reggio.

This situation lasted until the French invasion of 1796, which brought bloodshed (the massacre of Lugo, looting, heavy taxation, the destruction of Cesena University) but also innovative ideas in social and political fields. Under Napoleonic rule Romagna received recognition as an entity for the first time, with the creation of the provinces of the Pino (Ravenna) and Rubicone (Forlì). When in 1815 the Congress of Vienna restored the pre-war situation, secret anti-Papal societies were formed, and riots broke out in 1820, 1830–31 and 1848.

This opposition was fuelled by the Mazzinian propaganda and the direct action of Giuseppe Garibaldi. Men like Felice Orsini, Piero Maroncelli and Aurelio Saffi were among the protagonists of the Italian Risorgimento.

In a re-united Italy
However, after joining the unification of Italy in 1860, Romagna was not awarded separate status by the Savoy monarchs, who were afraid of dangerous destabilizing tendencies in the wake of the popular figures cited above.

In the early 20th century the autonomy of Romagna was advocated by Aldo Spallicci, Giuseppe Fuschini, Emilio Lussu and others. A movement proposing separation from Emilia-Romagna was created in the 1990s.

Notable People from Romagna
 Titus Maccius Plautus (c. 254 BC-184 BC), Roman playwright.
 Lamberto Scannabecchi (1060-1130), later Pope Honorius II (1124-1130).
 Melozzo da Forlì (c. 1438-1494), painter.
 Evangelista Torricelli (1608-1647), physicist and mathematician, invented the barometer and contributed to the development of calculus.
 Arcangelo Corelli (1653-1713), baroque violinist and composer.
 Giovanni Battista Morgagni (1682-1771), anatomist, considered the father of modern anatomical pathology.
 Giovanni Vincenzo Antonio Ganganelli (1705-1774), Pope Clemens XIV from 1769, suppressed the Society of Jesus.
 Gioacchino Rossini (1792-1868), musician and composer.
 Giovanni Angelo Braschi (1717-1799), Pope Pius VI from 1775 to his death.
 Barnaba Chiaramonti (1742-1823), Pope Pius VII from 1800 to his death.
 Marco Giuseppe Compagnoni (1754-1833), constitutionalist and writer, father of the Italian flag.
 Felice Orsini (1819-1858), revolutionary, tried to assassinate Napoleon III, Emperor of the French.
 Pellegrino Artusi (1820-1911), writer and businessman.
 Gregorio Ricci Curbastro (1853-1925), mathematician, invented tensor calculus.
 Giovanni Pascoli (1855-1912), poet and scholar.
 Benito Mussolini (1883-1945), politician and journalist, fascist leader of Italy (1922-1943) and the Italian Social Republic (1943-1945).
 Francesco Baracca (1888-1918), WWI flying ace, with 34 confirmed kills against Austro-Hungarian Air Force aircraft.
 Pietro Nenni (1891-1980), politician, secretary of the Italian Socialist Party.
 Federico Fellini (1920-1993), famed film director, writer, and actor, winner of five Academy Awards.

Flags

References

External links
"Other Romagna", a local institution
La Romagna 
RomagnaOggi.it, a newspaper serving the region online 
Romagna2020.it, official website of a local committee promoting a 2020 Olympics bid 

Geographical, historical and cultural regions of Italy
Geography of Emilia-Romagna
History of Emilia-Romagna